The seventh season of Smallville, an American television series, began airing on September 27, 2007. The series recounts the early adventures of Kryptonian Clark Kent as he adjusts to life in the fictional town of Smallville, Kansas, during the years before he becomes Superman. The seventh season comprises 20 episodes and concluded its initial airing on May 15, 2008, marking the second season to air on The CW television network. Regular cast members during season seven include Tom Welling, Michael Rosenbaum, Kristin Kreuk, Allison Mack, Erica Durance, Aaron Ashmore, Laura Vandervoort, and John Glover. In addition to bringing in new regular cast members this season, the Smallville team brought in familiar faces from the Superman media history, old villains from the show's past, as well as new DC Comics characters Kara Zor-El and Dinah Lance.

This season focuses on Clark Kent meeting his biological cousin Kara (Vandervoort), and teaching her how to control her abilities in public; Lana Lang's behavior toward her friends, Lex Luthor, and after it is discovered that she faked her own death; Chloe coming to terms with her newly discovered kryptonite-induced ability; and the secret of the Daily Planet's new editor Grant Gabriel. Towards the end of the season, Clark faces the dual threat from returning villain Brainiac (James Marsters), and Lex's discovery of his father's secret society who possess the means to control Clark. The season culminates with a showdown between Lex and Clark at the Fortress of Solitude, wherein the fortress is brought down, setting the series up for the following season.

Smallvilles season seven, along with many other American television shows, was caught in the middle of a contract dispute between the Writers Guild of America, East (WGAE), Writers Guild of America, west (WGAw) and the Alliance of Motion Picture and Television Producers (AMPTP). The dispute led to a strike by the writers, which has caused this season to end prematurely with only twenty episodes being produced, instead of the standard twenty-two episodes. The strike also forced The CW to push back airdates on several episodes, and cost Allison Mack her directorial debut. Smallvilles Season seven slipped in the ratings, averaging 3.7 million viewers weekly, and the series ranked as the 175th most-watched television series, out of 220, for the 2007–08 television year.

Episodes

Production

Writer's strike

On November 5, 2007, a strike began between the Writers Guild of America, East (WGAE), Writers Guild of America, west (WGAw) and the Alliance of Motion Picture and Television Producers (AMPTP). A prolonged strike would have forced television shows to end their seasons early, because no scripts could be written until a settlement had been reached. The strike pushed back Smallville's scheduling, as the episode "Siren", which was originally intended to be aired on January 10, 2008, was moved to a February 7 airdate. According to Gough and Millar, "We were able to complete scripts for 15 episodes [...] To the best of [our] knowledge, the studio plans to produce all of them." They also explained that the fifteenth episode would have had a cliffhanger ending. The shortened schedule also meant Allison Mack would not see her directorial debut for the season's 20th episode as was originally planned. On February 12, 2008, after a 48-hour vote by the guild members, the strike came to an end. This allowed the shooting of five new episodes that began airing on April 17, 2008. This was in addition to the episodes that had already been filmed, leaving the season total at twenty episodes.

Characters
For season seven, the Smallville team would bring in two new regular cast members, Jimmy Olsen, who first appeared as a recurring guest in season six, and Kara Zor-El, Clark's biological cousin. On July 11, 2007, Canadian actress Laura Vandervoort was officially announced to be portraying Kara. According to Gough and Millar, her backstory is that she was sent to look after Kal-El (Clark), but was stuck in suspended animation for eighteen years. When the dam broke in the season six finale "Phantom" she was set free. She will have all of Clark's abilities, as well as the ability to fly. Gough iterated that Kara will not wear any version of the Supergirl costume. On July 6, 2007, it was announced that Michael Cassidy was cast as the new editor of the Daily Planet, Grant Gabriel. Cassidy's Grant Gabriel is designed to be Lois' new love interest; he appeared in seven episodes this season.

Smallville also brought in more actors with previous connections to the Superman lore this season. Helen Slater, who portrayed Supergirl in the 1984 film of the same name, was cast as Lara, Clark's biological mother. She made appearances in episodes six and eight, titled "Lara" and "Blue" respectively. During the 2007 Comic Con, it was revealed that Dean Cain, who played Clark Kent/Superman in Lois & Clark: The New Adventures of Superman, would have a guest role as a "the evil Dr. Curtis Knox" in the fourth episode "Cure". Marc McClure, who portrayed Jimmy Olsen in all of the Superman films as well as in Supergirl, was brought in to play a Kryptonian scientist named Dax-Ur for the episode "Persona". James Marsters was brought back to reprise his role as Milton Fine/Brainiac in a four-episode arc slated for January 2008; Marsters had not appeared on the show since the season five finale "Vessel". Another character from the DC Comics universe arriving on Smallville is the Black Canary. The character was intended to be featured in the January 10, 2008 episode "Siren", but the Writers' Strike pushed scheduling back to February 7. Black Canary was portrayed by Canadian actress Alaina Huffman, and the episode featured the return of Justin Hartley as the Green Arrow. This season also saw the return of Sam Jones III as Pete Ross, after a four-year absence from the show.

Tie-ins
In 2008 The CW entered into a partnership with the makers of Stride brand chewing-gum to give viewers the opportunity to create their own Smallville digital comic, titled Smallville: Visions. The writers and producers developed the comic's beginning and end, but allowed viewers to provide the middle. The CW began this tie-in campaign with the March 13, 2008 episode "Hero", where Pete develops superhuman elasticity after chewing some kryptonite-infused Stride gum. Going to The CW's website, viewers vote on one of two options—each adding four pages to the comic—every Tuesday and Thursday until the campaign ended on April 7, 2008. For season seven, Smallville again worked with Sprint, bringing its customers "mobisodes" featuring Clark's cousin Kara, titled Smallville Legends: Kara and the Chronicles of Krypton.

Reception
The season premiere, "Bizarro", was watched by 5.18 million viewers, marking an increase from the previous season finale, "Phantom", which was viewed by 4.14 million. "Bizarro" and "Cure" were also the highest-rated episodes of the season, both being seen by 5.18 million viewers and scoring a 1.8 in the Nielsen rating in the 2 year old and up demographic. Nielsen ratings are audience measurement systems that determine the audience size and composition of television programming in the United States. This means that the episodes were seen by 1.8 percent of all viewers in the United States watching television at the time of the episode's airing that were older than 2 years old. The season hit a low with the fourteenth episode, "Traveler", which was watched by only 3.44 million viewers. The season finale, "Arctic", was viewed by 3.85, marking a decrease from both the season premiere, and the sixth-season finale. Smallvilles season seven slipped in the ratings, averaging 3.7 million viewers weekly. Smallville ranked as the 175th most-watched television series, out of 220, for the 2007–08 television year.

Awards
"Bizarro" was nominated for a VES award in Outstanding Compositing in a Broadcast Program or Commercial, specifically for the flood scene; it was also nominated for, and won the Emmy Award for Outstanding Sound Editing for a Series. In 2009, the season received five Teen Choice Awards nominations. The nominations include Choice TV Show: Action Adventure, Choice TV Actor: Action Adventure for Tom Welling, Choice TV Actress: Action Adventure for Kristen Kreuk, Choice TV: Villain for Michael Rosenbaum, and Choice TV: Sidekick for Allison Mack.

Home media release 
The complete seventh season of Smallville was released on September 9, 2008 in North America in both DVD and Blu-ray format. The DVD and Blu-ray box set were also released in region 2 and region 4 on October 13, 2008 and March 3, 2009, respectively. The box set included various special features, including episode commentary, a documentary on the Supergirl character, a featurette on the different actors to portray Jimmy Olsen, as well as mobisodes for Smallville Legends.

References

External links

 
 
 List of Smallville season 7 episodes at Wikia
 
 List of Smallville season 7 guide at kryptonsite.com

7
2007 American television seasons
2008 American television seasons